Donna Vekić was the defending champion, but lost in the semifinals to Johanna Konta in a rematch of the previous year's final.

Ashleigh Barty won the title, defeating Konta in the final, 6–3, 3–6, 6–4.

Seeds

Draw

Finals

Top half

Bottom half

Qualifying

Seeds

Qualifiers

Qualifying draw

First qualifier

Second qualifier

Third qualifier

Fourth qualifier

Fifth qualifier

Sixth qualifier

References
 Main Draw
 Qualifying Draw

Nottingham Open - Singles
Women's Singles
Nottingham Open